Carnegie may refer to:

People
Carnegie (surname), including a list of people with the name
Clan Carnegie, a lowland Scottish clan

Institutions

Named for Andrew Carnegie 
Carnegie Building (Troy, New York), on the campus of Rensselaer Polytechnic Institute
Carnegie College, in Dunfermline, Scotland, a former further education college
Carnegie Community Centre, in downtown Vancouver, British Columbia
Carnegie Council for Ethics in International Affairs
Carnegie Endowment for International Peace, a global think tank with headquarters in Washington, DC, and four other centers, including:
Carnegie Middle East Center, in Beirut
Carnegie Europe, in Brussels
Carnegie Moscow Center
Carnegie Foundation (disambiguation), any of several foundations
Carnegie Hall, a concert hall in New York City
Carnegie Hall, Inc., a regional cultural center in Lewisburg, West Virginia
Carnegie Hero Fund
Carnegie Institution for Science, also called Carnegie Institution of Washington (CIW)
Carnegie library, libraries built with grants paid by Carnegie
Carnegie Medal (literary award), a British award for children's literature
Carnegie Mellon University
Carnegie Institute of Technology (CIT), now part of the Carnegie Mellon University
Carnegie Museum of Art, in Pittsburgh, Pennsylvania, which awards the
Carnegie Prize
Carnegie Museum of Natural History, featuring the famous Dinosaur Hall
Carnegie collection, a series of educational figures based on the exhibits in Dinosaur Hall
Carnegie Steel Company
Carnegie United Kingdom Trust, a charitable foundation

Named for industrialist David Carnegie 
Carnegie Investment Bank, Swedish investment bank
 Carnegie Art Award, a Swedish art prize

Places

Australia 
Carnegie, Victoria, a suburb of Melbourne, Australia
Carnegie railway station, Melbourne
Lake Carnegie (Western Australia)

United States 
Carnegie, California, a former populated place
Carnegie, Georgia
Carnegie, Minnesota
Carnegie, Oklahoma
Carnegie, Pennsylvania
Carnegie, Wisconsin
Lake Carnegie (New Jersey), at Princeton University

Other
Carnegie (board game), a board game introduced in 2022
Carnegie (horse) (1991–2012), a Thoroughbred racehorse and sire
Carnegie (yacht), a brigantine yacht launched in 1909, destroyed in 1929, a non-magnetic survey ship of the Carnegie Institution
Carnegie Deli, in New York City
Carnegie stages of embryonic development
Carnegie State Vehicular Recreation Area, in California
Leeds Carnegie, a brand name used by several sports teams
USS Carnegie (CVE-38), or HMS Empress, a World War II escort aircraft carrier

See also

 Carnegie station (disambiguation)